{{Infobox person
| name               = Tejashri Pradhan
| image              = Tejashree Pradhan .jpg
| caption            = Pradhan in 2018
| image_size         = 
| birth_name         = 
| birth_date         = 
| birth_place        = Mumbai, Maharashtra
| nationality        = Indian
| occupation         = Actress
| years_active       = 2007-present
| known_for          = | education          = 
| spouse             = 
| signature          = Tejashree Pradhan Signature.svg
}}
Tejashri Pradhan (born 2 June 1988) is an Indian television and film actress who has appeared in multiple Marathi films and television serials. She is better known as Shubhra and Janhvi from the Zee Marathi television serials Aggabai Sasubai (2019) and Honar Sun Mi Hya Gharchi (2013), respectively. Pradhan also did voice-overs for a mobile application named Go-stories which features various Marathi stories. She has also appeared in a YouTube video Uncomfortable and been a speaker at TED Talks.

Early life
Pradhan was born on 2 June 1988 in a middle class Maharashtrian CKP family. She belongs to the suburb of Dombivli near Mumbai. When she was 15, she decided to enroll in a personality development course that came along with a course in acting. She received the offer of films in her second year at college.

 Personal life 
She rose to prominence after her role in Marathi TV series Honar Sun Me Hya Gharchi. She married co-actor Shashank Ketkar from this series in 2014 and they divorced in 2016.

Acting career 
Debut and early work (2007–2013)
She made her debut on television with "Hya Gojirvanya Gharat". She also played a small role in " Tuza Ni Maza Ghar Shrimantacha". After that, she played a role for " Lek Ladaki Hya Gharchi". She debuted in Marathi films with "Zenda" (2010).

Success and beyond (2013–present)
In 2013, she bagged the role of Janhavi in "Honar Sun Me Hya Gharchi". She also played roles in various Marathi films such as Sharyat, Lagna Pahave Karun, Dr. Prakash Baba Amte, Judgement, Asehi Ekada Vhave. She is also known for her performance in " Ti Saddhya Kay Karte" (2017). In the same year, she hosted a reality show Sur Nava Dhyas Nava. In 2019, she got big break in Bollywood with Babloo Bachelor. she appeared in "Aggabai Sasubai" as Shubhra.

 Other works and media image 
Tejashri has also appeared as a guest in many shows. Her first guest appearance was in Chala Hawa Yeu Dya in 2013 where she promotes her serial Honar Sun Me Hya Gharchi. After her marriage, she made an appearance in Home Minister with her husband (Shashank Ketkar). After that, she again appeared in Chala Hawa Yeu Dya for promoting Ti Saddhya Kay Karte (2017). In 2018, she appeared in Tumchyasathi Kay Pan where she promotes Sur Nava Dhyas Nava. In 2019, she appeared as a guest in Kanala Khada. In 2021, she again appeared in Chala Hawa Yeu Dya for promoting Aggabai Sasubai. 

In 2020, she was ranked third in The Times of India's'' Top 15 most desirable women on Marathi television.  In 2019, she was ranked ninth among the "Most popular Marathi TV actress". She was the named in the Pune Most desirable women. In 2021, She is included in first place on "Most Desirable Actress in Marathi Television". In the same year, she was ranked sixth in "Maharashtra's Stunning & Desirable Beauties". 

In addition to her acting career, Pradhan endorses several brands, including Dishwasher bar, ZEE5, Vicco Turmeric, L'Oréal, K-Pra, etc. She also did voice-overs for a mobile application named Go-stories which features various Marathi cine artists.

In 2021, she launched her own production house with Kirti Nerkar called TeK Productions.

Filmography

Films

Television

Special appearances

Web series

Stage plays

Music videos

Awards and nominations

See also 

 List of Marathi television actors
 List of Indian television actresses
List of Hindi film actresses

References

External links
 
 
 

Living people
Actresses in Marathi cinema
Marathi actors
1988 births